The Very Best of Electric Light Orchestra may refer to:

 The Very Best of the Electric Light Orchestra, 1994
 All Over the World: The Very Best of Electric Light Orchestra, 2005
 Mr. Blue Sky: The Very Best of Electric Light Orchestra, 2012